The ranat ek lek is a metallophone used in the classical music of Thailand. It is the smaller of the two sizes of Thai metallophone; the larger one is called ranat thum lek.

This musical instrument was originated in the reign of King Rama IV (1854-1868).

The ranat ek lek consists of flat metal slabs placed over a rectangular wooden resonator. It is played with two bamboo sticks with padded ends.

The ranat ek lek is very similar to the Khmer roneat dek.

See also
ranat (musical instrument)

References

External links

Listening
Khryang Tii : hit instruments (made of metal) page from SEAsite

Plaque percussion idiophones
Keyboard percussion instruments
Thai musical instruments